In set theory, a branch of mathematics, the Milner – Rado paradox, found by , states that every ordinal number  less than the successor  of some cardinal number  can be written as the union of sets  where  is of order type at most κn for n a positive integer.

Proof
The proof is by transfinite induction.  Let   be a limit ordinal (the induction is trivial for successor ordinals), and for each , let  be a partition of  satisfying the requirements of the theorem.

Note .

Define:

Observe that:

and so  .

As for the order types, clearly .

References

How to prove Milner-Rado Paradox? - Mathematics Stack Exchange

Set theory
Paradoxes